Eleutherodactylus verrucipes is a species of frog in the family Eleutherodactylidae.
It is endemic to Mexico.
Its natural habitats are subtropical or tropical moist lowland forests and subtropical or tropical moist montane forests.
It is threatened by habitat loss.

References

Sources

verrucipes
Amphibians described in 1885
Taxonomy articles created by Polbot